= World Luxury Day =

International observance on 8 October

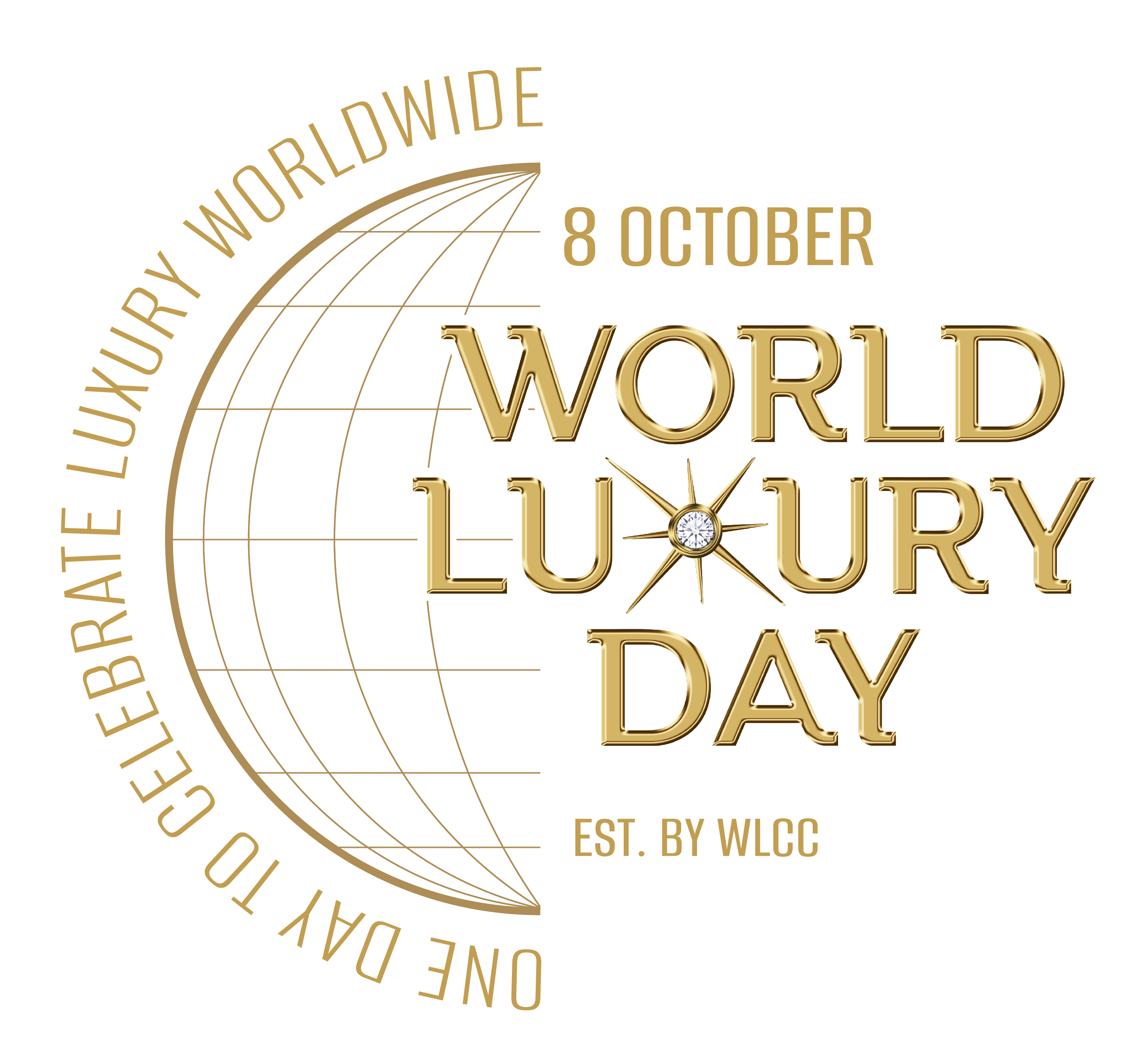
- Status: active
- Date: 8 October
- Frequency: annually
- Founder: World Luxury Chamber of Commerce
- Area: Worldwide
- Major events: Exhibitions, panel discussions, pop-up showcases, editorial features, brand activations, and sustainability/charitable initiatives
- Organiser: World Luxury Chamber of Commerce
- Website: https://worldluxuryday.com

World Luxury Day is an international observance held on 8 October. It was established by the World Luxury Chamber of Commerce (WLCC) to recognize craftsmanship, entrepreneurship, and collaboration in the luxury sector.

== Overview ==
In 2024, World Luxury Chamber of Commerce (WLCC), led by President Alexander Chetchikov, has officially announced the creation of World Luxury Day on 8 October to unite the industry and raise awareness about contemporary directions in luxury. The World Luxury Chamber of Commerce (WLCC) is a global network that connects luxury brands and industry leaders to promote collaboration, innovation, sustainability, and cultural preservation in the luxury sector.

World Luxury Day is the first global, professional holiday for the entire luxury industry. It is a day dedicated to honoring the people, artistry, innovation, and ethical progress that define the world of luxury across all sectors. While luxury is often associated primarily with high-end products, the day emphasizes the professional community behind these creations. According to some sources, millions of people worldwide are employed in the luxury industry, spanning design, craftsmanship, marketing, retail, and management.

== Celebration ==
Organisations, brands and media mark World Luxury Day with a mix of activities such as exhibitions, panel discussions, pop-up showcases, editorial features, brand activations and charitable or sustainability initiatives.

In October 2025, during World Luxury Day, the Luxury Lifestyle Awards announced winners in the "Top 100 Luxury Brands of the World" and "Top 100 Luxury Marketing Leaders of the World" categories. The event initiated an annual awards program recognising brands and individuals for their contributions to innovation, product quality and consumer experience in the luxury sector.
